Lower Asaro Rural LLG is a local-level government (LLG) of Eastern Highlands Province, Papua New Guinea. The Tokano language is spoken in the LLG.

Wards
01. Mando-Yamayufa
02. Korepa
03. Asaro No. 1
04. Asaro No. 2
05. Tafeto/Wantrifu
06. Gamiyuho
07. Lunumbeyuho
08. Kanosa
09. Kofena

References

Local-level governments of Eastern Highlands Province